is a Norwegian lake that lies in Tjeldsund in the county of Troms og Finnmark, just north of the border with the county of Nordland.

See also
 List of lakes in Norway
 Geography of Norway

References

Tjeldsund
Reservoirs in Norway
Lakes of Troms og Finnmark